Nelly Restar (December 16, 1939 – August 22, 2021) was a Filipino sprinter. She competed in the women's 4 × 100 metres relay at the 1964 Summer Olympics. She also competed in the now defunct 80-meter hurdles. She placed fifth in the said the event during the 1966 Asian Games in Bangkok.

She is a member of the Amazons track and field team of the Cebu Institute of Technology (CIT) in the 1960s. During this time most member of the Philippine track and field team came from CIT.

Restar retired from track and field in 1968, and got married the following year. She worked as a librarian at CIT and later returned to her home province of Aklan to work as a public school teacher.

In April 2021, she experienced a stroke leaving her bedridden. She was rushed to a hospital in Aklan on August 22, 2021, but died due to a heart disease.

References

External links
 

1939 births
2021 deaths
Athletes (track and field) at the 1964 Summer Olympics
Filipino female sprinters
Olympic track and field athletes of the Philippines
Place of birth missing
Olympic female sprinters
Athletes (track and field) at the 1966 Asian Games